The Scream was an American hard rock band based in Los Angeles, originally formed in 1989 as Saints or Sinners. The band originally featured former Angora singer John Corabi and former Racer X members guitarist Bruce Bouillet, bassist Juan Alderete, and drummer Scott Travis. However, Scott Travis quickly left to join Judas Priest, and was replaced by former Shark Island drummer Walt Woodward III. Scott Travis co-wrote "I Don't Care" on Let It Scream, though he did not actually play on the album.

They changed their name from Saints or Sinners to The Scream shortly after Walt Woodward III replaced Scott Travis. Many of the songs on their 1991 debut Let It Scream were performed by the band in concert before the album was ever recorded.

After releasing their 1991 debut Let It Scream on Hollywood Records, which included the single "I Believe in Me", Corabi left the band to replace the recently departed Vince Neil in Mötley Crüe. The Scream then recruited former Dashboard Mary singer Billy Fogarty and recorded their second album, Takin' It to the Next Level, but were dropped from the record label before the album could be released. The Scream split up and Fogarty, Bouillet and Alderete went on to form a brief musical project with John Moore and drummer Abe Laboriel Jr. called DC-10, which recorded and released the album Co-Burn.

John Corabi joined Mötley Crüe after Vince Neil's departure and recorded the self-titled 1994 album with the band. However, poor sales and inadequate tour support resulted in Vince Neil's return to the band. Corabi has played in many bands since, including Ratt, Union and E.S.P., a covers band with other big names Eric Singer, Bruce Kulick, Chuck Garrick and Karl Cochran (often performing many songs from the various members well known bands). Since February 2015, Corabi has joined The Dead Daisies with which he has recorded two studio albums (Revolución in 2015 and Make Some Noise in 2016).

Walt Woodward III died on June 8, 2010, of alcohol poisoning.

Members 
 John Corabi – lead vocals, acoustic guitar (1989–1992)
 Billy Fogarty – lead vocals (1992–1993)
 Bruce Bouillet – guitars (1989–1993)
 Juan Alderete (as John Alderete) – bass, backing vocals (1989–1993)
 Scott Travis – drums (1989)
 Walt Woodward III – drums, backing vocals (1990–1993)

Timeline

Discography

Studio albums
 Let It Scream (1991)

Unreleased albums
 Takin' It to the Next Level (recorded 1993)

Soundtrack appearances
 In 1992, they released the single "Young and Dumb" for the movie Encino Man (the track is played in "Blades", while 'Link' paints with ketchup and mustard).

References

Related links 
 
 Out of your speakers and into your living room...it's THE SCREAM! The Racer X tribute to The Scream
 The Scream, on Sleaze Roxx

Hard rock musical groups from California
Musical groups from Los Angeles
Hollywood Records artists